Rhonda Fleming (born Marilyn Louis; August 10, 1923 – October 14, 2020) was an American film and television actress and singer. She acted in more than 40 films, mostly in the 1940s and 1950s, and became renowned as one of the most glamorous actresses of her day, nicknamed the "Queen of Technicolor" because she photographed so well in that medium.

Career

Early life
Fleming was born Marilyn Louis in Hollywood, California, to Harold Cheverton Louis, an insurance salesman, and Effie Graham, a stage actress who had appeared opposite Al Jolson in the musical Dancing Around at New York's Winter Garden Theatre from 1914 to 1915. Fleming's maternal grandfather was John C. Graham, an actor, theater owner, and newspaper editor in Utah.

She began working as a film actress while attending Beverly Hills High School, from which she graduated in 1941. She was discovered by the well-known Hollywood agent Henry Willson, who changed her name to "Rhonda Fleming".

"It's so weird", Fleming said later. "He stopped me crossing the street. It kinda scared me a little bit – I was only 16 or 17. He signed me to a seven-year contract without a screen test. It was a Cinderella story, but those things could happen in those days."

David O. Selznick
Fleming's agent Willson went to work for David O. Selznick, who put her under contract. She had bit parts in In Old Oklahoma (1943), Since You Went Away (1944) for Selznick, and in When Strangers Marry (1944).

She received her first substantial role in the thriller, Spellbound (1945), produced by Selznick and directed by Alfred Hitchcock. "Hitch told me I was going to play a nymphomaniac", Fleming said later. "I remember rushing home to look it up in the dictionary and being quite shocked." The film was a success and Selznick gave her another good role in the thriller The Spiral Staircase (1946), directed by Robert Siodmak.

Selznick lent her out to appear in supporting parts in the Randolph Scott Western Abilene Town (1946) at United Artists and the film noir classic Out of the Past (1947) with Robert Mitchum and Kirk Douglas, at RKO, where she played a harried secretary.

Fleming's first leading role came in Adventure Island (1947), a low-budget action film made for Pine-Thomas Productions at Paramount Pictures in the two-color Cinecolor process and co-starring fellow Selznick contractee Rory Calhoun.

Fleming then auditioned for the female lead in a Bing Crosby film, a part Deanna Durbin turned down at Paramount in A Connecticut Yankee in King Arthur's Court (1949), a musical loosely based on the story by Mark Twain. Fleming exhibited her singing ability, dueting with Crosby on "Once and For Always" and soloing with "When Is Sometime". They recorded the songs for a three-disc, 78-rpm Decca album, conducted by Victor Young, who wrote the film's orchestral score. Her vocal coach in Hollywood, Harriet Lee, praised her "lovely voice", saying, "she could be a musical comedy queen". The movie was Fleming's first Technicolor film. Her fair complexion and flaming red hair photographed exceptionally well and she was nicknamed the "Queen of Technicolor", a moniker not worth much to her as she would have preferred to be known for her acting. Actress Maureen O'Hara expressed a similar sentiment when the same nickname was given to her around this time.

She then played another leading role opposite a comedian, in this case Bob Hope, in The Great Lover (1949). It was a big hit and Fleming was established. "After that, I wasn't fortunate enough to get good directors", said Fleming. "I made the mistake of doing lesser films for good money. I was hot – they all wanted me – but I didn't have the guidance or background to judge for myself."

In February 1949, Selznick sold his contract players to Warner Bros, but he kept Fleming.

In 1950 she portrayed John Payne's love interest in The Eagle and the Hawk, a Western.

Fleming was lent to RKO to play a femme fatale opposite Dick Powell in Cry Danger (1951), a film noir. Back at Paramount, she played the title role in a Western with Glenn Ford, The Redhead and the Cowboy (1951).

In 1950, she ended her association with Selznick after eight years, though her contract with him had another five years to run.

Paramount 
Fleming signed a three-picture deal with Paramount. Pine-Thomas used her as Ronald Reagan's leading lady in a Western, The Last Outpost (1951), John Payne's leading lady in the adventure film Crosswinds (1951), and with Reagan again in Hong Kong (1951).

She sang on NBC's Colgate Comedy Hour during the same live telecast that featured Errol Flynn, on September 30, 1951, from the El Capitan Theater in Hollywood.

Fleming was top-billed for Sam Katzman's The Golden Hawk (1952) with Sterling Hayden, then was reunited with Reagan for Tropic Zone (1953) at Pine-Thomas. In 1953, Fleming portrayed Cleopatra in Katzman's Serpent of the Nile for Columbia. That same year, she filmed a western with Charlton Heston at Paramount, Pony Express (1953), and two films shot in three dimensions (3-D), Inferno with Robert Ryan at Fox, and the musical Those Redheads From Seattle with Gene Barry, for Pine-Thomas. The following year, she starred with Fernando Lamas in Jivaro, her third 3-D release, at Pine-Thomas. She went to Universal for Yankee Pasha (1954) with Jeff Chandler. Fleming also traveled to Italy to play Semiramis in Queen of Babylon (1954).

Late 1950s

Fleming was part of a gospel singing quartet with Jane Russell, Connie Haines, and Beryl Davis.

Much of the location work for Fleming's 1955 Western Tennessee's Partner, in which she played Duchess opposite John Payne as Tennessee and Ronald Reagan as Cowpoke, was filmed at the Iverson Movie Ranch in Chatsworth, California, (known as the most heavily filmed outdoor location in the history of film and television). A distinctive monolithic sandstone feature behind which Fleming (as Duchess) hid during an action sequence, later became known as the Rhonda Fleming Rock. The rock is part of a section of the former movie ranch known as "Garden of the Gods", which has been preserved as public parkland.

Fleming was reunited with Payne and fellow redhead Arlene Dahl in a noir at RKO, Slightly Scarlet (1956). She did other thrillers that year; The Killer Is Loose (1956) with Joseph Cotten and Fritz Lang's While the City Sleeps (1956), co-starring Dana Andrews, at RKO. Fleming was top billed in an adventure movie for Warwick Films, Odongo (1956).

Fleming had the female lead in John Sturges's Gunfight at the O.K. Corral (1957) co-starring Burt Lancaster and Kirk Douglas, a big hit. She supported Donald O'Connor in The Buster Keaton Story (1957) and Stewart Granger in Gun Glory (1957) at MGM.

In May 1957, Fleming launched a nightclub act at the Tropicana in Las Vegas. It was a tremendous success. "I just wanted to know if I could get out on that stage – if I could do it. And I did! ... My heart was to do more stage work, but I had a son, so I really couldn't, but that was in my heart."

Fleming was Guy Madison's co star in Bullwhip (1958) for Allied Artists, and supported Jean Simmons in Home Before Dark (1958), which she later called her favorite role ("It was a marvellous stretch", she said).

Fleming was reunited with Bob Hope in Alias Jesse James (1959) and did an episode of Wagon Train. She was in the Irwin Allen/Joseph M. Newman production of The Big Circus (1959), co-starring Victor Mature and Vincent Price. This was made for Allied Artists, whom Fleming later sued for unpaid profits.

Fleming travelled to Italy again to make The Revolt of the Slaves (1959) and was second billed in The Crowded Sky (1960).

Semi-retirement
In 1960, she described herself as "semi-retired", having made money in real estate investments. That year she toured her nightclub act in Las Vegas and Palm Springs.

Television
During the 1950s, 1960s, and into the 1970s, Fleming frequently appeared on television with guest-starring roles on The Red Skelton Show, The Best of Broadway, The Investigators, Shower of Stars, The Dick Powell Show, Wagon Train, Burke's Law, The Virginian, McMillan & Wife, Police Woman, Kung Fu, Ellery Queen, and The Love Boat.

In 1958, Fleming again displayed her singing talent when she recorded her only LP, entitled simply Rhonda (reissued in 2008 on CD as Rhonda Fleming Sings Just For You).  In this album, which was released by Columbia Records, she blended then-current songs like "Around The World" with standards such as "Love Me or Leave Me" and "I've Got You Under My Skin". Conductor-arranger Frank Comstock provided the musical direction.

On March 4, 1962, Fleming appeared in one of the last segments of ABC's Follow the Sun in a role opposite Gary Lockwood. She played a Marine in the episode, "Marine of the Month".

In December 1962, Fleming was cast as the glamorous Kitty Bolton in the episode, "Loss of Faith", on the syndicated anthology series, Death Valley Days, hosted by Stanley Andrews. In the story line, Kitty pits Joe Phy (Jim Davis) and Peter Gabriel (Don Collier) to run against each other for sheriff of Pima County, Arizona. Violence results from the rivalry.

Later career
In the 1960s, Fleming branched out into other businesses and began performing regularly on stage and in Las Vegas.

One of her final film appearances was in a bit-part as Edith von Secondburg in the comedy The Nude Bomb (1980) starring Don Adams. She also appeared in Waiting for the Wind (1990).

Fleming has a star on the Hollywood Walk of Fame. In 2007, a Golden Palm Star on the Palm Springs Walk of Stars was dedicated to her.

Personal life and death

Fleming worked for several charities, especially in the field of cancer care, and served on the committees of many related organizations. In 1991, her fifth husband, Ted Mann, and she established the Rhonda Fleming Mann Clinic for Women's Comprehensive Care at the UCLA Medical Center.

In 1964, Fleming spoke at the "Project Prayer" rally attended by 2,500 at the Shrine Auditorium in Los Angeles, California. The gathering, which was hosted by Anthony Eisley, a star of ABC's Hawaiian Eye series, sought to flood the United States Congress with letters in support of mandatory school prayer, following two decisions in 1962 and 1963 of the United States Supreme Court, which struck down mandatory school prayer as conflicting with the Establishment Clause of the First Amendment to the United States Constitution.

Joining Fleming and Eisley at the rally were Walter Brennan, Lloyd Nolan, Dale Evans, Pat Boone, and Gloria Swanson. Fleming declared, "Project Prayer is hoping to clarify the First Amendment to the Constitution and reverse this present trend away from God." Eisley and Fleming added that John Wayne, Ronald Reagan, Roy Rogers, Mary Pickford, Jane Russell, Ginger Rogers, and Pat Buttram would also have attended the rally had their schedules not been in conflict.

Fleming married six times:

 Thomas Wade Lane, interior decorator, (1940–1942; divorced), one son
 Dr. Lewis V. Morrill, Hollywood physician, (July 11, 1952 – 1954; divorced)
 Lang Jeffries, actor, (April 3, 1960 – January 11, 1962; divorced)
 Hall Bartlett, producer (March 27, 1966 – 1972; divorced)
 Ted Mann, producer, (March 11, 1977 – January 15, 2001; his death)
 Darol Wayne Carlson (2003 – October 31, 2017; his death)

Through her son Kent Lane (b. 1941), Rhonda also had two granddaughters (Kimberly and Kelly), four great-grandchildren (Wagner, Page, Lane, and Cole), and two great-great-grandchildren.

She was a Presbyterian However she may have embraced the Jewish faith of fifth husband, producer Ted Mann,
as she was eventually interred in his plot at the Jewish Hillside Memorial park upon her death.

She was a Republican who supported Dwight Eisenhower during the 1952 presidential election.

Fleming died on October 14, 2020, in Saint John's Health Center, Santa Monica, California, at the age of 97. She is interred at Hillside Memorial Park in Culver City, California.

Filmography
source:

Television

Radio appearances

References

External links

 
 Rhonda Fleming photos
 Rhonda Fleming photos
 Rhonda Fleming images of films
 Photos of Rhonda Fleming in Spellbound by Ned Scott
 Rhonda Fleming Rock at the Iverson Movie Ranch
 Iverson Movie Ranch: History, vintage photos

1923 births
2020 deaths
20th-century American actresses
Actresses from Hollywood, Los Angeles
American Presbyterians
American women singers
American film actresses
American television actresses
Burials at Hillside Memorial Park Cemetery
California Republicans
Traditional pop music singers
Western (genre) film actresses
21st-century American women